Teen Dream is the third studio album by American dream pop duo Beach House. It was released on January 26, 2010 as the band's debut album on the record label Sub Pop. Internationally, the album was released by Bella Union in Europe, Mistletone Records in Australia, and Arts & Crafts in Mexico. The album was produced by the band and Chris Coady.

The album received universal acclaim from music critics, who hailed it as one of the best albums of 2010. NME included it in their 2013 edition of the 500 Greatest Albums of All Time. The album was also included in the 2014 edition of the book 1001 Albums You Must Hear Before You Die. In October 2019, Pitchfork ranked it in the 21st position among the best albums of the 2010s.

Recording
The recording of Teen Dream took place after extensive touring of the Beach House's previous album, Devotion (2008). According to Legrand, while on tour "we definitely stored up a lot of energy and ideas that we had. By the end of the touring cycle we couldn't wait to get back home to start working on the next record. In some ways, touring is a restraint on the creative side, because it's hard to write on the road. So you just have to wait, and sit on this anticipation until the time you're able to spend days, weeks, months working on something."  The duo strove to create a more "sophisticated" album and, according to the group, the demos of this record were comparable to the final tracks that made up their previous record. Also, their use of extensive reverb was held back significantly. According to Alex Scally "There's very little reverb on the record".

Recording this album was considerably more expensive; Scally says, "Every bit of money we got, we spent. The recording was insanely expensive. Every single step of the way, we've just tried to go more, go further".

"Norway" was released online on November 17, 2009, with the full album leaking onto the Internet a few days later.

Critical reception

Teen Dream received critical acclaim. Review aggregator Metacritic, which collates reviews from various publications, indicates a score of 82 out of 100 from 35 professional critics, indicating "universal acclaim". Many reviews commented on the change in sound including BBC Music, who stated that "the most unmistakeable sound on Teen Dream is that of a band truly finding its own voice". Several publications focused on Victoria Legrand's vocals, with Jody Rosen of Rolling Stone complimenting Legrand's "dusky torch singing" and The Boston Phoenix praising her voice as "coiling like smoke in the arches of the church". Robert Christgau, writing in MSN Music, selected "Lover of Mine" and "Norway" as highlights and awarded the album an honorable mention rating. In a negative review, Tom Hughes of The Guardian felt that Teen Dream is "carefully, even beautifully arranged", but nonetheless "oddly icy and melodically a little ineffectual". Audra Schroeder of The Austin Chronicle called the album "solid" but felt that it was "not Beach House's masterpiece," quipping that the duo "still got some gold dust to kick up".

Accolades

Commercial performance 
The album debuted 43 on the Billboard 200 with 13,000 copies sold in its first week. It has sold a total of 140,000 copies as of May 2012. As of April 2012 Teen Dream has sold 21,000 vinyl copies in United States according to Nielsen Soundscan.

The song Take Care was used for the soundtrack of Chemical Hearts, during the end credits.

Track listing

A special edition DVD package was released containing either a CD or vinyl and a DVD, featuring psychedelic visuals for each track from Teen Dream, produced by a separate director.

Personnel
Credits adapted from the liner notes of Teen Dream.

Beach House
 Victoria Legrand – vocals, keyboards, organs, bells "from outer space"
 Alex Scally – guitar, basses, organs, piano, harmony vocals, four-track

Additional musicians
 Dan Franz – drums (tracks 1–7, 10), percussion (tracks 1, 2, 7)
 Graham Hill – drums (tracks 8, 9), percussion (tracks 3–6, 8, 9)

Production
 Chris Coady – production, engineering, mixing
 Beach House – production; arrangement
 Nilesh Patel – mastering

Artwork
 Beach House – art conception
 Dustin Summers – layout and cover design
 Frank Hamilton – lyric book and mirror photography
 Steve Bloom – back cover photography

Charts

References

External links
 Teen Dream at Sub Pop

2010 albums
Beach House albums
Bella Union albums
Sub Pop albums
Albums produced by Chris Coady